Miroslav Krobot (born 12 November 1951) is a Czech theatre director and actor. He starred in the film The Man from London, which was entered into the 2007 Cannes Film Festival.

His daughter Lenka Krobotová is also an actress.

Selected filmography
 Wrong Side Up (2005)
 The Man from London (2007)
 3 Seasons in Hell (2009)
 Alois Nebel (2011)
 The House (2011)
 Leaving (2011)
 In the Shadow (2012)
 Revival (2013)
 Spoor (2017)

References

External links

1951 births
Living people
Czech theatre directors
Czech male film actors
People from Šumperk
Sun in a Net Awards winners
Czech male television actors
Czech male stage actors
Czech film directors
Czech Lion Awards winners